Schwedt (or Schwedt/Oder) is a town in Brandenburg, in northeastern Germany. With the official status of a Große kreisangehörige Stadt (major district town), it is the largest town of the Uckermark district, located near the river Oder, which forms the border with Poland.

Overview
The formerly agrarian town today has one of the largest oil refineries (PCK Raffinerie GmbH) in Germany, established in 1958 and connected to the Russian Druzhba pipeline network. The refinery uses 20 million cubic meters of water per year for the process.

A large paper factory (UPM) is located near Schwedt. Most industries were located in the remote area during communist rule in the 1960s and 1970s.

Large residential areas were built for the workers moving to Schwedt. About 9% of the town's flats are in prefab concrete buildings (Plattenbau) dating from the era. As many jobs were lost after German reunification and the return to market economy, Schwedt has lost a quarter of its population since 1990. In recent decades, Schwedt became a model town for the demolition of Plattenbau housing to combat urban decay.

Geography
Schwedt is situated in the east of the historic Uckermark region stretching from the Oder to the Havel River. It is situated on a sandur at the western edge of the Oder floodplain running along the German-Polish border, which in 1995 was declared as the Lower Oder Valley National Park nature reserve.

Local districts
In a 1974 municipal reform, the neighbouring village of Heinersdorf was incorporated into Schwedt, followed by Blumenhagen, Gatow and Kunow in 1993, by Kummerow in 1998, by Criewen and Zützen in 2001, Stendell in 2002, the former town Vierraden in 2003, Schöneberg in January 2021 and Berkholz-Meyenburg, Mark Landin and Passow in April 2022. With  Schwedt is among the 100 largest German municipalities by area.

Nearest cities and towns
Gartz (Germany), Penkun (Germany), Szczecin (Poland), Gryfino (Poland), Cedynia (Poland), Chojna (Poland), Mieszkowice (Poland), Moryń (Poland), Trzcińsko-Zdrój (Poland), Myślibórz (Poland), Pyrzyce (Poland).

History
After the Migration Period, the area had been settled by Polabian Slavs. From 937 onwards the lands of the Slavic Ukrani tribes in the west were subdued by the Saxon forces of Margrave Gero and incorporated into his vast Marca Geronis, while the lands east of the Oder were held by Pomeranian tribes under sovereignty of the newly formed Duchy of Poland ruled by Duke Mieszko I. The Saxon Northern March was lost in the Great Slav Rising of 983, and not before 1147 the Saxon count Albert the Bear again invaded the lands on the Oder river, which remained disputed between the newly established Margraviate of Brandenburg and the Pomeranian dukes.

The settlement of Schwedt was first mentioned in a 1265 deed. In the course of the Brandenburg–Pomeranian conflict, the Brandenburg margrave Louis II the Roman ceded it to Duke Barnim III of Pomerania in 1354. It was again besieged by the first Hohenzollern margrave Frederick I in 1434, but to no avail. In 1481 the Thuringian counts of Hohnstein acquired the estates; they granted town privileges to Schwedt as well as to neighbouring Vierraden and introduced the Protestant Reformation.

The rise of Schwedt came to an end with the extinction of the Hohnstein counts in 1609 and the disastrous Thirty Years' War, when the town on the road from Stettin to Berlin was plundered several times. In 1631 King Gustavus Adolphus of Sweden, after landing in Pomerania, camped here on his way to the Battle of Breitenfeld. Six years later the Swedish field marshal Johan Banér set the town on fire, after its citizens refused to capitulate.

During the Great Northern War, the Treaty of Schwedt was signed in the town.

Near the end of World War II, over two months of heavy fighting destroyed an estimated 85 percent of the town, including the Schwedt Castle. The Soviet Army occupied Schwedt on April 26, 1945, two weeks before the final defeat of Nazi Germany. Afterwards it formed part of East Germany. During the 1960s, the government of the DDR expanded housing and encouraged people to move to Schwedt, a trend that ended with the fall of Communism.

Demography

Twin towns – sister cities

Schwedt is twinned with:

 Chojna, Poland
 Gryfino, Poland
 Koszalin, Poland
 Leverkusen, Germany
 Moryń, Poland
 Tuapse, Russia

Notable people

Heinrich Schmelka (1777–1837), stage actor
Leonhardt von Blumenthal (1810–1900), Prussian Field Marshal
Karl von Schmidt (1817–1875), Prussian cavalry commander
Paul von Hintze (1864–1941), naval officer, diplomat and politician
Max Lemke (1895–1985), officer, Major-General last in World War II
Heinz von Cleve (1897–1984), actor
Horst Wendlandt (1922–2002), film producer
Jörg Hoffmann (born 1970), freestyle swimmer
Britta Steffen (born 1983), freestyle swimmer

References

External links

 
 
official website of National Park "Unteres Odertal" 
official website of PCK Raffinerie GmbH 

 
Localities in Uckermark (district)
Germany–Poland border crossings
Socialist planned cities